Streptomyces alanosinicus is a bacterium species from the genus of Streptomyces which was isolated from soil in Brazil. Streptomyces alanosinicus produces the antibiotics alanosine and spicamycin.

See also 
 List of Streptomyces species

References

Further reading

External links
Type strain of Streptomyces alanosinicus at BacDive -  the Bacterial Diversity Metadatabase

alanosinicus
Bacteria described in 1966